The 1946 Football Championship of UkrSSR were part of the 1946 Soviet republican football competitions in the Soviet Ukraine as well as Soviet Group 3, a predecessor of the Soviet Second League.

It was the first republican league competition following the World War II, a record of which has been preserved. The top 2 from each group also qualified for the 1947 Vtoraya Gruppa, Zone Ukraine.

Qualification group stage

West

Center

East

South

Final

Ukrainian clubs at the All-Union level
 First Group (1): Dynamo Kyiv
 Second Group (5): Lokomotyv Kharkiv, Kharchovyk Odesa, Shakhtar Stalino, Stal Dnipropetrovsk, Sudnobudivnyk Mykolaiv

References

External links
 1946. Football Championship of the UkrSSR (1946. Первенство УССР.) Luhansk Nash Futbol.
 Group 1: ukr-football.org.ua
 Group 2: ukr-football.org.ua
 Group 3: ukr-football.org.ua
 Group 4: ukr-football.org.ua
 Group 5: ukr-football.org.ua
 Group 6: ukr-football.org.ua
 Final: ukr-football.org.ua

Ukraine
Football Championship of the Ukrainian SSR
Championship